Wang Xueqi (born 19 March 1946) is a Chinese film actor whose career has spanned over 25 years. He was often cast in early Fifth Generation films, such as Chen Kaige's Yellow Earth (1984) and The Big Parade (1986), Huang Jianxin's Samsara, and Zhang Yimou's Codename Cougar (1989). He has since carved out a niche in the Chinese market as a character actor.

He has recently appeared in award-winning roles in Forever Enthralled (2008) and Bodyguards and Assassins (2009)

Wang has also directed one film, Sun Bird, which the screenwriter Yang Liping also co-directed. The film won a Special Grand Prize of the Jury at the Montreal World Film Festival.

Filmography

Variety show

References

External links 

Wang Xueqi at the Chinese Movie Database

|-
! colspan="3" style="background: #DAA520;" | Asian Film Awards
|-

|-
! colspan="3" style="background: #DAA520;" | Hong Kong Film Critics Society Awards
|-

1946 births
Living people
Male actors from Beijing
Film directors from Beijing
Chinese male film actors
Chinese male television actors
Best Actor Asian Film Award winners